Glenea diverselineata is a species of beetle in the family Cerambycidae. It was described by Maurice Pic in 1926.

Subspecies
 Glenea diverselineata birmanica Breuning, 1956
 Glenea diverselineata diverselineata Pic, 1926
 Glenea diverselineata intermedia Breuning, 1968

References

discomaculata
Beetles described in 1926